Divergent: Original Motion Picture Soundtrack is the soundtrack album to the 2014 film Divergent, based on the book series of the same name. The soundtrack for the film was chosen by music supervisor Randall Poster. The Divergent: Original Motion Picture Soundtrack album released on March 11, 2014, while the Original Score of the film released on March 18, 2014, by Interscope Records. The soundtrack album sold 10,000 copies in its first week of release.

The first single from the soundtrack album, "Find You" by Zedd featuring Matthew Koma and Miriam Bryant, was released on January 26, 2014. "Beating Heart" by Ellie Goulding was released on April 22, 2014, as the second single from the soundtrack.

Divergent: Original Motion Picture Soundtrack

Background
Ellie Goulding's song "Dead in the Water" from her 2012 album Halcyon was featured in the film's first official clip, released on December 19, 2013. The song was later included on the soundtrack album. Goulding has four songs on the soundtrack album (three tracks on the 'standard' soundtrack album, and one as bonus song on the deluxe edition) and she also provided vocals for the score of the film (on four tracks). According to director Neil Burger, "We started working with songs from Ellie Goulding's album Halcyon and soon found that the texture of her music and the tone of her voice perfectly matched our film. In many ways Ellie has become the inner voice of our heroine Tris."

Inspiration for the soundtrack came from Kanye West's 2013 album Yeezus. According to music supervisor Randall Poster, "One of the great creative breakthroughs we had was that we, talking to Neil Burger the director, really looked at Kanye's Yeezus record and 'Black Skinhead' in particular and said, 'You know what, musically this sounds like the world of Dauntless, obviously, the lyrical topicality was not going to work for us and so doing some exploration we sort of landed on this [French DJ] producer Gesaffelstein who worked with Kanye [West]." Randall further talked about the soundtrack album, "I think that one of the challenges for a movie like this is that it's set in the future and so you sort of have to figure out, 'OK, what might music in the future sound like?' The film is actually set not in a perfected future, but actually kind of in a future world that is deteriorating. And so we wanted to create a musical element that had reflected on current music sounds, but also felt kind of time-forward and had a certain futuristic element. Really our notion was to find music that was dangerous, tribal and had electronic elements without really being dance-y."

The album also contained music from British alternative rock band Snow Patrol, Kendrick Lamar, Tame Impala, M83, ASAP Rocky and Pia Mia.

Marketing
The soundtrack album was available on Pitchfork Advance, a music streaming platform that host full-length pre-release albums in advance, from March 7 to 10, 2014.

Track listing

Charts

Divergent: Original Motion Picture Score

The score of the film was composed by Junkie XL, with Hans Zimmer executive producing the album. They both previously collaborated on Man of Steel, The Dark Knight Rises, Shark Tale, Megamind and the Madagascar series. Ellie Goulding is featured as a vocalist on the score. The album was released digitally in United States on March 18, 2014, by Interscope Records, and was later released in both physical and digital formats internationally on March 31, 2014.

Track listing
"Tris" (featuring Ellie Goulding) – 7:48
"The Test" – 3:17
"Choosing Dauntless" (featuring Ellie Goulding) – 3:44
"Capture the Flag" (featuring Ellie Goulding) – 3:06
"This Isn't Real" – 1:38
"Ferris Wheel" – 3:31
"Erudite Plan" – 3:20
"Fear" – 3:36
"I Am Divergent" – 1:38
"A Friend" – 2:47
"Conspiracy" – 5:26
"Watertank" – 1:50
"Faction Before Blood" – 6:48
"Human Nature" – 3:12 
"Final Test" – 1:37
"The March" – 5:17
"Dauntless Attack" – 5:55
"Sacrifice" (featuring Ellie Goulding)	– 4:20
"You're Not Gonna Like This" (digital bonus track) – 14:00
"Fight the Dauntless" – 4:13
"Everywhere and Nowhere" – 2:28

References

External links
 Official Divergent soundtrack website
 
 

2014 soundtrack albums
Film scores
Action film soundtracks
The Divergent Series
Interscope Records soundtracks
Junkie XL albums